is a Japanese actor.

He was born on May 7, 1976, in Tokyo, Japan. Because of his father's business, he spent his early life in Singapore (1983–86) and New York (1986–89), and thus learned to speak English fluently.  After returning to Japan, he started to learn acting. He joined the theatrical company "Wakakusa" at the age of 14, and left the company at the age of 16.

His first screen role was "April Story (Shigatsu monogatari)" directed by movie director Shunji Iwai in 1998. After graduation from Gakushuin University, he again decided to learn acting. He entered the acting school "En",and graduated in 2001.

In 2007 he met Japanese movie director, Koji Wakamatsu. He did five movies with Wakamatsu, including "United Red Army". In this movie, he played Tsuneo Mori, the leader of the United Red Army. The movie won the C.I.C.A.E Prize (the International Confederation of Art House Cinemas) and NETPAC Prize (Network for the Promotion of Asian Cinema) in the 58th Berlin International Film Festival.

He practices Iaijutsu. Iaijutsu is an ancient Japanese martial art, and a quick-draw sword technique. He has been training in Iaijutsu from master Tetsuzan Kuroda for about 16 years.

Filmography
April Story, directed by Shunji Iwai (1998)
The Choice of Hercules, directed by Masato Harada (2002)
United Red Army, directed by Kōji Wakamatsu  (2008)
Caterpillar, directed by Kōji Wakamatsu  (2008)
11:25 The Day He Chose His Own Fate, directed by Kōji Wakamatsu  (2012)
Petrel Hotel Blue, directed by Kōji Wakamatsu  (2012)
The Millennial Rapture, directed by Kōji Wakamatsu  (2012)
Yurusarezaru Mono, directed by  Lee Sang-il  (2013)
Twisted Justice, directed by Kazuya Shiraishi (2016)
A Bride for Rip Van Winkle, directed by Shunji Iwai (2016)
That Disappearance, directed by Hiro Kano (2022)

References

External links
Go Jibiki's official website

Japanese male film actors
Male actors from Tokyo
20th-century Japanese male actors
21st-century Japanese male actors
1976 births
Living people